Synaptotagmin-like protein 4 is a protein that in humans is encoded by the SYTL4 gene.

References

Further reading